Raymond William Lessard (December 21, 1930 – January 3, 2016) was an American prelate of the Roman Catholic Church. He served as the 12th bishop of the Diocese of Savannah in Georgia from 1973 to 1995.

Biography

Early life
Raymond Lessard was born on December 21, 1930, in Grafton, North Dakota, US to a largely French-Canadian family. Lessard was raised on a farm and educated at St. Aloysius Academy in Oakwood, North Dakota.  He then attended St. Paul Seminary in St. Paul, Minnesota, 

Lessard was ordained to the priesthood by Archbishop Martin O’Connor on December 16, 1956, for the Diocese of Fargo. Lessard later worked at the Vatican in Rome, both during and after the Second Vatican Council (1962–1965) as an official of the Consistorial Congregation.

Bishop of Savannah
On March 5, 1973, Lessard was appointed the twelfth Bishop of Savannah by Pope Paul VI. He received his episcopal consecration on  April 27, 1973, from Archbishop Thomas Donnellan, with Bishops Justin Driscoll and Francis Gossman serving as co-consecrators. Lessard once served as liaison between Catholic bishops and married Episcopalian clergy seeking Catholic ordination. He once described racism as "the paramount social problem affecting our area".Within the United States Conference of Catholic Bishops, Lessard chaired the Committee for Pastoral Research and Practices.

Retirement and legacy
Due to his chronic back problems, Lessard submitted his resignation as bishop of the Diocese of Savannah to Pope Paul II. The pope accepted it on February 7, 1995. Lessard then became a professor at St. Vincent de Paul Regional Seminary in Boynton Beach, Florida, where he taught ecclesiology.

Raymond Lessard died at his home, on January 3, 2016, at St. Vincent de Paul.

Sex abuse scandal and cover-up

In October, 2009, the diocese of Savannah paid $4.24 million to settle a lawsuit that alleged Lessard allowed Father Wayland Brown, to practice ministry in the diocese when Lessard knew that Brown was a serial child molester.

See also

 Catholic Church hierarchy
 Catholic Church in the United States
 Historical list of the Catholic bishops of the United States
 List of Catholic bishops of the United States
 Lists of patriarchs, archbishops, and bishops

References

External links
Roman Catholic Diocese of Savannah

1930 births
2016 deaths
People from Walsh County, North Dakota
20th-century Roman Catholic bishops in the United States
Participants in the Second Vatican Council
Catholic Church sexual abuse scandals in the United States
University of St. Thomas (Minnesota) alumni
Roman Catholic bishops of Savannah, Georgia
Roman Catholic Diocese of Fargo
Religious leaders from North Dakota
Catholics from North Dakota